The Whareatea River is a river of the West Coast Region of New Zealand's South Island. It flows generally northwest to reach the Tasman Sea five kilometres to the east of Westport.

See also
List of rivers of New Zealand

References

Rivers of the West Coast, New Zealand
Buller District
Rivers of New Zealand